Pedrosa is a surname. Notable people with the surname include:

 Adrià Pedrosa, Spanish footballer
 Cyril Pedrosa, French comic book artist, colorist and writer
 Dani Pedrosa, Spanish Grand Prix motorcycle racer
 Inês Pedrosa, Portuguese journalist, novelist, short story writer, children's writer and playwright
 Veronica Pedrosa, independent broadcast journalist, news presenter and moderator

See also
Coma Pedrosa, the highest mountain in the principality of Andorra